Scruton is a surname, and may refer to:

 Gordon Scruton (born 1947), bishop
 Howard Scruton (born 1962), hockey player
 Joan Scruton (1918–2007), English sports organizer
 Nick Scruton (born 1984), English rugby league player
 Roger Scruton (1944–2020), English philosopher

English-language surnames